La Vida... es un Ratico (English: Life... Is a Moment) is the fourth studio album recorded by Colombian singer-songwriter Juanes, which was released by Universal Music Latino on October 23, 2007 (see 2007 in music).

Album history
Juanes has stated that the album is to be completed in Spanish and has a "very Colombian" sound to it. Juanes co-produced this record, working with a two-time Academy Award-winning producer, Gustavo Santaolalla. It has been said that the album has typical Colombian sounds, such as the "guasca," "vallenato," and "cumbia."

When choosing the name for this record, Juanes was inspired by a conversation he had with his mother, who told him to "Not worry, because life is just a moment." Following what that phrase means, Juanes thought of creating an album remembering that life passes you by in a blink of an eye and concentrating more on his family and beloved beings.

The first single "Me Enamora" was released on September 3, 2007, to the media and online stores, such as iTunes and reached number one in 19 countries. The second single is "Gotas de Agua Dulce".

This album won the Latin Grammy Award for Album of the Year and Best Male Pop Vocal Album; and the lead single "Me Enamora" also received three awards for Record of the Year, Song of the Year and Best Short Form Music Video in the 9th Annual Latin Grammy Awards. At the 51st Annual Grammy Awards this album won for Grammy Award for Best Latin Pop Album.

This album was reissued on September 15, 2008, with three new songs and eight tracks recorded live on his tour in the United States and Europe. The special edition will include also a DVD with new footage from Juanes' tour and the music videos the three singles released already. The confirmed new tracks for this re-edition are: "Falsas Palabras" (recorded with Gustavo Santaolalla in late 2007) and "Odio por Amor" (the first single from this revamped edition).

Track listing
Standard Edition
 "No Creo en el Jamás" – 3:32
 "Clase de Amor" – 3:53
 "Me Enamora" – 3:14
 "Hoy Me Voy" – 3:23
 "La Vida es un Ratico" – 4:05
 "Gotas de Agua Dulce" – 3:11
 "La Mejor Parte de Mí" – 3:42
 "Minas Piedras" – 4:05
 "Tú y Yo" – 4:26
 "Báilala" – 3:31
 "Difícil" – 4:01
 "Tres" – 3:25
 "Bandera de Manos" – 4:06

Bonus tracks 
14. "Bandera de Manos"
15. "La Camisa Negra" (Australian Edition)
16. "Falsas Palabras" (iTunes Pre-Order)
17. "Dove Le Pietre Sono Mine (Minas Piedras)" (featuring Negrita) Italian Re-Release
18. "Me Enamora" (Full Phatt Remix) Japan Re-Release
19. "Tres" (Full Phatt Remix) Japan Re-Release

2008 re-release
"Odio por Amor"
"Falsas Palabras"
"No Creo en el Jamás"
"Clase de Amor"
"Me Enamora"
"Hoy Me Voy"
"La Vida es un Ratico"
"Gotas de Agua Dulce"
"La Mejor Parte de Mí"
"Minas Piedras" (featuring Andrés Calamaro)
"Tú y Yo"
"Báilala"
"Difícil"
"Tres"
"Bandera de Manos" (featuring Campino)
"Bandera de Manos"
"Hoy Me Voy" (featuring Colbie Caillat)
"Bailala (Remix Dance)"

DVD track listing
Juanes: A Musical Journey (Director's Cut)
Behind the Cameras of "Me Enamora"
La Vida... Es Un Ratico (interview with Juanes)

Musicians
Guitar/Voice/Keyboards: Juanes
Drums: Victor Indrizzo
Bass: Fernando "Toby" Tobón
Drums and Accordion: Chelito de Castro
Percussion: Felipe Alzate

Personnel
Produced by: Gustavo Santaolalla and Juanes
Associate producer: Aníbal Kerpel
Executive producer: Adrian Sosa
Recorded at: Las Montañas de Medellín, Colombia, La Casa and Henson Studios
Engineer at "Las Montañas de Medellín": Juanes
Engineer at "La Casa": Anibal Kerpel
Engineer at "Henson": Thom Russo
Engineer for Andrés Calamaro vocals: Jorge Da Silva at Ion Studios.
Strings recorded at: Track Record, North Hollywood by Steve Churchyard
Strings arranged, orchestrated and conducted by David Campbell
Mixing at: Hit Factory by Thom Russo
Mastering: Tom Baker at Prevision Mastering
Design: Eduardo Chavarín and Luis Díaz
Graphic production: Carolina Larrea and Eduardi Chavarín
Photography: www.raulhiguera.com
Cover: René Shenduda

Chart performance
In the United States, the album debuted at number 13 on the Billboard 200 album chart, selling about 47,000 copies in its first week.

Charts

Charts

Certifications

See also
2007 in Latin music
La Vida World Tour
List of certified albums in Romania

References

2007 albums
Juanes albums
Latin Grammy Award winners for Album of the Year
Universal Music Columbia albums
Universal Music Latino albums
Latin Grammy Award for Best Male Pop Vocal Album
Spanish-language albums
Grammy Award for Best Latin Pop Album
Albums produced by Gustavo Santaolalla